Nique or Nique or variation, may refer to:

 Nique Needles, Australian musician
 Rimi Nique, Thai singer-songwriter
 Alto de Nique, a mountain on the border of Panama and Colombia
 The Technique, the Georgia Institute of Technology student newspaper

See also

 Niq, Azerbaijan, Iran
 Mo'Nique (born 1967), American comedian and actress
 
 
 Dominique (disambiguation)
 Knick (disambiguation)
 Monique (disambiguation)
 NIC (disambiguation)
 Nick (disambiguation)
 Nickey (disambiguation)
 Nickie (disambiguation)
 Nicky (disambiguation)
 Nik (disambiguation)
 Nicki
 Nikki (disambiguation)
 Nikky
 Niky
 Nix (disambiguation)